Call Call Call (also known as 2nd Album) is the second studio album by South Korean singer, U;Nee. It was released on February 18, 2005, by Synnara Music. The album is considered U;Nee's best musical work, among fans and critics alike. It is currently out of print, and is considered a rare find among collectors. It is the last album to be released during her lifetime.

Overview
Call Call Call marked a complete transition in U;Nee's image from a dance-pop singer to a sexy R&B singer. U;Nee had plastic surgery for the album, specifically her jaw, nose and breasts. The album's music represents almost a complete genre change for U;Nee, containing songs with mostly an R&B sound, considering the ballads "아버지 (Father)" and "그날 이후 (From That Day)", the Eastern-styled song, "초대 (Invitation)", and the dance-pop song, "I Want You". Like the first album, one single was released, but this time, the single, "Call Call Call" managed to enter the top 10 of the Korean Music Charts. However, the video for "Call Call Call" was banned by most Korean music video stations for partial nudity, even though censors were put into the video. On the other hand, most people see no reason to ban the video, as the sexual content was not severe. The song "아버지" is suggested to be about U;Nee's father. It was performed several times during promotion of the album, much like 두번째 트릭 (Trick 2).

Track listing

Call Call Call
 "One"
 "아버지 (Father)"
 "Call Call Call" (Samples "Hit the Freeway", by Toni Braxton).
 "전화해 (Telephoning)"
 "여우 (Fox)"
 "유혹 (Temptation)"
 "Don't Cry Again"
 "그날 이후 (From That Day)"
 "립스틱	(Lipstick)"
 "초대 (Invitation)"
 "I Want You"
 "Call Call Call (Ver. 2)"

Passion & Pure - EP
"Call Call Call (Club Mix)" (Samples "In da Club", by 50 Cent.)
"전화해 (Club Mix)"
"여우 (Club Mix)"
"One"
"아버지 (Father)"
"Call Call Call"
"전화해"
"그날 이후"
"초대 (Invitation)"
"I Want You"

Promoted songs
 Call Call Call (Ver. 2)
 Call Call Call (Club Mix)
 아버지 (Father)

2005 albums
U;Nee albums